The 1960 Jacksonville State Gamecocks football team represented Jacksonville State College (now known as Jacksonville State University) as a member of the Alabama Collegiate Conference (ACC) during the 1960 NAIA football season. Led by 14th-year head coach Don Salls, the Gamecocks compiled an overall record of 3–6 with a mark of 2–1 in conference play.

Schedule

References

Jacksonville State
Jacksonville State Gamecocks football seasons
Jacksonville State Gamecocks football